The Land Before Time VII: The Stone of Cold Fire is a 2000 American direct-to-video animated adventure musical drama and the seventh film in The Land Before Time series, produced and directed by Charles Grosvenor. It stars the voices of Thomas Dekker, Anndi McAfee, Aria Curzon, Jeff Bennett and Rob Paulsen, and introduces Charles Kimbrough, Patti Deutsch, Jim Cummings and British actor Michael York. This was the only Land Before Time film to be written by Len Uhley. This is the first installment to not have John Ingle's narration. Starting with The Stone of Cold Fire, Taiwanese-American studio Wang Film Productions takes over the overseas animation work on the entire Land Before Time series until the 2007–08 television series of the same name and The Land Before Time XIII: The Wisdom of Friends, after South Korean studio AKOM provided their animation for the last five direct-to-video sequels: The Great Valley Adventure, The Time of the Great Giving, Journey Through the Mists, The Mysterious Island, and The Secret of Saurus Rock.

Plot 

Late one night, Littlefoot sees a strange, blue-colored meteor falling from the sky and crashing into the Threehorn's Peak, an active volcano in the mountain range. When Littlefoot describes it the next morning, the adults in Great Valley do not take it as a serious matter if they even believe it at all, except for two newcomers, the mysterious "Rainbow Faces", who are dinosaurs with rainbow-colored beaks. The Rainbow Faces tell them of possibilities of wonders beyond what they know, and suggest the rock may be a stone of cold fire, which is capable of possessing magical properties. Cera's father, however stops the faces and forbids them or anybody else to "fill the children's heads with rubbish". Littlefoot tries to tell Cera's father he knows where the flying rock was and how to find it. But Cera's father warns Littlefoot the Mysterious Beyond, especially parts with volcanoes, are off-limits. Littlefoot's grandfather agrees and tells Littlefoot that until some far-walkers leave the Great Valley, it would be better if they don't make any more fuss about the flying rock.

Pterano, the long lost outcast uncle of Littlefoot's friend Petrie, overhears the entire conversation and conspires to find the rock to use its powers to take control of the valley. Pterano gets Petrie, who idolizes him, to tell him the rock's location. Littlefoot's friend Ducky overhears Pterano's plan, but before she can warn the others, Pterano and his cronies, Rinkus, a Rhamphorhynchus, and Sierra, a Cearadactylus, capture her and set out to find the Stone. Upon discovering Ducky's abduction, the adults tell the young ones how Pterano led some of their herd during their search for the valley, but had accidentally brought his followers to a pack of Deinonychus. Pterano was able to fly away, but the event left him emotionally scarred, and he was expelled from the herd as punishment for leading his followers into danger. Because the adults are slow to reach a decision, Littlefoot, Petrie, Cera, and Spike take off by themselves in search of Ducky.

Meanwhile, Ducky escapes the Flyers and falls into a cave while fleeing. After the children find her, Ducky comforts Petrie, who is distraught about his uncle's actions, by stating she could tell that Pterano is the least wicked of the three Flyers, and so still has a potential of doing good. Rinkus and Sierra suddenly re-capture Ducky and pursue the children in violation of Pterano's orders, but the children are able to outsmart the two evil Flyers. As the Flyers fly away, Petrie tells them not to go and a thunderstorm comes. Later as the thunderstorm comes and there is wind, thunder and lightning, the adult dinosaurs meet and Grandpa Longneck tells Petrie's mother to find another flier to help her and hurry. Meanwhile during the thunderstorm, Sierra displays mutinous feelings towards Pterano, but Rinkus convinces him to hold off betraying Pterano until they find the Stone. Pterano sings a song about how a very important creature he is.

The children pursue the Flyers, hoping to reach the Stone before them. They reach inside the cave and sleep there, and the thunderstorm lasts until morning. The children wake up in the morning and aided by the Rainbow Faces, who suddenly appear and offer their knowledge of volcanoes, they manage to reach Threehorn Peak before the Flyers. However, both groups discover the Stone is just an ordinary meteorite. Lamenting over this realization, Pterano explains he had meant to create a paradise with the power of the stone, not realizing that this paradise already exists in the form of the Great Valley. Unwilling to believe the Stone is not magical, Rinkus and Sierra betray Pterano. However, as they start bashing the Stone to make it give them power, the volcano begins to violently erupt, and Pterano sees Ducky holding on to a cliff and falls, but Pterano saves her from certain death.

Petrie's mother arrives with a Quetzalcoatlus (who is a huge flyer) to evacuate the children, leaving Rinkus and Sierra to be caught in the meteorite's explosion, and they land back at the site where they camped earlier (quite burned, singed, and bruised). Pterano is thanked for saving Ducky's life. Back in the Great Valley, the grown-ups have a meeting and decide about Pterano's fate. For rescuing the children (spoken by Littlefoot's grandfather), Pterano's exile from the Valley will be reduced to until five cold times have passed (five winters/years). Petrie cuts in and tries to plead against the punishment, begging the grown-ups to let Pterano live in the Valley forever. However, Petrie's mother tells Petrie that even though Pterano may be sorry, it does not change what he did (erase his actions) and he must still be held responsible. Pterano, agreeing with the banishment, tells Petrie that everyone (including himself) has to take responsibility for their actions and assures Petrie that he should be fine. Accepting the result, Petrie tearfully bids Pterano farewell with the latter saying he will miss Petrie before Cera's father forces Pterano away (begging him to move on). This prompts him to remark to the latter that there are things he will not miss at all.

That night, Littlefoot finds the Rainbow Faces and asks them if the meteorite really was a Stone of Cold Fire. They admit that while it wasn't, his effort to search for it was what really mattered, and reiterate that there are many unknowns to be discovered "beyond the Mysterious Beyond". Littlefoot is then momentarily distracted, and when he turns around, he finds the Rainbow Faces have disappeared in a pillar of light, and an object similar to the meteorite soars overhead and off into the night, indicating the Rainbow Faces are aliens. As his friends find him, an inspired Littlefoot reflects that there are many unknowns and that such unknowns make life wonderful.

Voice cast 

 Thomas Dekker as Littlefoot
 Anndi McAfee as Cera
 Aria Curzon as Ducky
 Jeff Bennett as Petrie / Spokes Dinosaur
 Michael York as Pterano
 Rob Paulsen as Rinkus/ Spike
 Jim Cummings as Sierra
 Kenneth Mars as Grandpa Longneck
 Miriam Flynn as Grandma Longneck
 John Ingle as Cera's father
 Tress MacNeille as Ducky's Mom / Petrie's Mom
 Charles Kimbrough as Rainbow Face #1
 Patti Deutsch as Rainbow Face #2

Production 

Production of the film had concluded by June 2000. This is the first film in the series to use Digital ink and paint rather than traditional cel animation that was used in the first 6 films.

Songs

Release

 December 5, 2000 (VHS and DVD)
 December 4, 2001 (VHS and DVD)
 December 2, 2003 (VHS and DVD - 4 Movie Dino Pack (Volume 2) and 9 Movie Dino Pack)
 November 29, 2005 (DVD - 2 Mysteries Beyond the Great Valley)

Reception 

Entertainment Weekly gave the film a "B" and wrote that it "beats the heck out of Barney's infantile dinosaur tales," with its "velociraptor-fast pace and a minimum of treacle". In August 2014, the New York Post ranked each of the 13 Land Before Time films released up to that point and placed The Stone of Cold Fire at number 10, writing, "Though not quite as annoying as 'Tinysauruses,' the name 'Rainbow Faces' comes pretty close."

The film received nominations for "Best Animated Video Premier" and "Best Animated Character Performance" for Littlefoot and Pterano at the Video Premiere Awards in 2001, losing to Joseph: King of Dreams and Batman Beyond: Return of the Joker, respectively. Aria Curzon received an award for "Outstanding Young Voice-Over" at the 23rd Young Artist Awards in 2002 for her role as Ducky in this film, as well as The Land Before Time V, The Land Before Time VI, and The Land Before Time VIII.

References

External links 
 

2000 animated films
2000 direct-to-video films
2000 films
2000s American animated films
American children's animated science fiction films
Direct-to-video sequel films
Films about ancient astronauts
Films about child abduction
Films directed by Charles Grosvenor
Films scored by Michael Tavera
The Land Before Time films
Meteorites in culture
UFO-related films
Films about volcanoes
Universal Animation Studios animated films
Universal Pictures direct-to-video animated films
Animated films about dinosaurs
2000s children's animated films
2000s English-language films